Donaukanaltreiben Festival in Vienna, Austria is one of the cultural festivals in Europe. It is held every year in June in several locations along the Donaukanal, in Vienna. Mainly Austrian professional and amateur bands are invited but from year to year the organisers invite bands from the neighbouring countries.

Locations

Previous years

Notes
Note 1: all days combined

References

External links
Official Website

Music festivals in Austria
Rock festivals in Austria
Festivals established in 1997
Festivals in Vienna
Electronic music festivals in Austria
Folk festivals in Austria
Summer events in Austria
1997 establishments in Austria